Shammar Yar'ish full name (Himyaritic: ,) was a Himyarite king.

Life

In AD 275, he led his troops to victory over Najran, Ma'rib (the Sabaeans later reconquered their capital) and Hadhramaut. He succeeded in uniting much of Yemen, assuming the title "King of Saba and Dhu Raydan and Hadhramaut and Yamnat" (Yamnat may have been the name of the Southern part of Yemen). From his time forward the Himyarite kings were known as "Tubba kings", and praised for their courage and leadership in traditional Yemeni poetry. Shamar name was recorded in Namara inscription.

Diplomacy
Shammar Yahri'sh sent a delegation to the Arab tribe of al-Azd and Tanukh and to the Sassanid court in Ctesiphon, which led to an exchange of ambassadors. At about the same time, the Roman emperor Constantius II sent the missionary Theophilus to ask if churches could be built for Roman India traders in the Himyarite territory.

Legacy
In about 280 AD, Shammar Yuharʿish, residing at his capital Ẓafār, united Yemen under his rule.
One hundred years later Abu Karib Asad, who was nicknamed "Asad al-Kamel" (the perfect one) fulfilled the highest aspirations of Shammar Yuharish. Under his leadership the old Sabaean Kingdom with Ma'rib as the capital was conquered and ceased to exist as an independent kingdom. The Axumites, who had become a strong power and had occupied the Tihamah and part of the highlands more than once, were driven back to Ethiopia. During his rule pre-Islamic Yemen probably reached its greatest expansion including southern parts of present Saudi Arabia and Oman as a whole.

In South Arabian lore 

It is believed that he conquered the Levant (Syria, Palestine). Its also believed that he subjugated the kingdom of Israel and Persia and reached as far as the Tibet. It is also believed he invaded Northern India and acquired much loot. His father king Yasir Yun'im conquered Egypt and reached as far as the Strait of Gibraltar.

See also 
 Shammar tribe

References

Ancient history of Yemen
3rd-century Yemeni people
3rd-century monarchs in the Middle East
Year of birth unknown
Year of death unknown
Middle Eastern kings